Impractical Joker or Impractical Jokers may refer to:

 The Impractical Joker, a 1937 animated short starring Betty Boop
 "The Impractical Joker" (Garfield and Friends), a television episode
 Impractical Jokers, an American hidden camera reality TV series
 Impractical Jokers UK, a British adaptation of the American TV series
 Impractical Jokers: The Movie, a 2020 American comedy film based on the TV series

See also
 Practical joker (disambiguation)
 Joker (disambiguation)